"I Do Me" is a song by Swedish singer Malou Prytz. The song was performed for the first time in Melodifestivalen 2019, where it made it to the final. The song came 12th in the grand final after coming 2nd in the second semi-final.

Charts

References

2019 singles
English-language Swedish songs
Melodifestivalen songs of 2019
Swedish pop songs